The manga series Cardcaptor Sakura is written and illustrated by the manga artist group Clamp. The first chapter premiered in the May 1996 issue of Nakayoshi, where it was serialized monthly until its conclusion in the June 2000 issue. The series focuses on Sakura Kinomoto, a fourth grade elementary school student who discovers that she possesses magical powers after accidentally freeing a set of magical cards from the book in which they had been sealed for years. She is tasked with retrieving those cards in order to avoid an unknown catastrophe from befalling the world.

The 50 unnamed chapters were collected and published in 12 tankōbon volumes by Kodansha starting on November 22, 1996; the last volume was released on July 31, 2000. Kodansha re-released the series in a hardcover edition from March 5, 2004, to February 2, 2005. Starting in March 2015, Kodansha began re-releasing the series in a nine-volume special edition to commemorate the 60th anniversary of Nakayoshi. Cardcaptor Sakura was adapted into a 70-episode anime series by Madhouse that aired in Japan on NHK from April 8, 1998, to March 21, 2000. Madhouse also produced two animated films released in 1999 and 2000. The manga series is licensed for regional language releases by Pika Édition in France, Star Comics in Italy, Egmont Manga & Anime in Germany, Editora JBC in Brazil, Ever Glory Publishing in Taiwan, Glènat España in Spain, Editorial Ivrea in Argentina, and Editorial Toukan in Mexico.

Kodansha released the first six volumes in bilingual editions that included both Japanese and English from May 12, 2000, to July 13, 2001. Cardcaptor Sakura was licensed for an English-language release in North America by Tokyopop. It released the volumes of Cardcaptor Sakura from March 1, 2000, to August 5, 2003. Tokyopop released the first six volumes with the book "flipped" from the original Japanese orientation, in which the book is read from right-to-left, to the Western format with text oriented from left-to-right. Volumes seven through twelve were released in the original orientation with the subtitle Master of the Clow. On October 7, 2003, and May 4, 2004, Tokyopop re-released the first six volumes in two box sets, each containing three volumes. The re-released volumes were updated to match the orientation and cover styling of the final six volumes. They were also released individually from July 6, 2004, to June 7, 2005. Madman Entertainment used Tokyopop's English translation to release the series in Australia and New Zealand. Dark Horse Manga published an English edition of the series in four omnibus volumes containing three of the original volumes each from October 2010 to September 2012.

Volume list

Cardcaptor Sakura

Cardcaptor Sakura: Clear Card

References

External links

Chapters
Lists of manga volumes and chapters